Juan Abelló Gallo (born 1941) is a Spanish billionaire businessman and art collector. In March 2021, Forbes estimated his wealth at $3 billion. In 2023, CEO World Magazine ranked him as the seventh richest individual in Spain with $2.8 billion in estimated net worth.

Early life
Juan Abelló was born in 1941 in Madrid, the son of a pharmacist father, Juan Abello Pascual. He has a bachelor's degree in pharmacy from the Complutense University of Madrid (1963), and a doctorate in pharmacy (1978) from Universidad Complutense de Madrid.

Career
In 1966 Abelló was appointed Managing Director of Antibióticos, S.A., the family group founded by his pharmacist father, Juan Abello Pascual, in 1919. The company had obtained the first licence in Spain in 1934 to manufacture opioid-derived medication. In 1986, he led the disposal of Antibióticos and other family pharma assets (maintaining Alergia e Inmunología Abelló, S.A. and Alcaloides, S.A.) to Montedison.

In 1990 he founded Torreal, a family-owned global investment firm with more than 25 portfolio companies, diversified across various segments and geographies.

In 2013, through Torreal, he invested in Investindustrial which controlled 37,5% of the automobile manufacturer Aston Martin. In 2018, through Torreal and in a joint-venture with the British investment fund GHO, Abelló started the company of cannabis-derived products Linneo Health.

In 2018, he named his son Miguel Abelló Gamazo executive vice-president of Torreal, and then president of the company in 2020.

Art collector
Abelló owns about 500 works of art, including pieces by Francisco Goya, El Greco, Edgar Degas, Pablo Picasso, Toulouse-Lautrec, Salvador Dalí, and Vincent van Gogh.

Abello owns one of the last large triptychs painted by Francis Bacon, Triptych 1983 (1983), and a small triptych by Bacon, Three Studies for a Portrait of Peter Beard (1975).

Personal life
Abelló is married to Ana Isabel Gamazo y Hohenlohe-Langenburg, grand-daughter of Prince Max Egon of Hohenlohe-Langenburg. They have four children. He is also an avid deer hunter.

References 

1941 births
Living people
Spanish art collectors
Spanish billionaires
20th-century Spanish businesspeople
21st-century Spanish businesspeople
People from Madrid
Complutense University of Madrid alumni
Members of the Board of Directors of the Banco Santander